Marcewo  is a village in the administrative district of Gmina Słupca, within Słupca County, Greater Poland Voivodeship, in west-central Poland.

The village has a population of 100.

History
During the German occupation of Poland (World War II), in 1940, the German gendarmerie carried out expulsions of Poles, who were then placed in a transit camp in Łódź, and afterwards deported to the General Government in the more eastern part of German-occupied Poland, while their houses and farms were handed over to German colonists as part of the Lebensraum policy.

References

Marcewo